Alice Towers (born 12 October 2002) is a British racing cyclist, who currently rides for UCI Women's Worldtour Team . Canyon // SRAM Racing

In 2022, Towers won the British National Road Race Championships.

Major results
2019
 4th Road race, National Junior Road Championships
2022
 1st  Road race, National Road Championships
 10th  Overall Belgium Tour

References

External links

2002 births
Living people
British female cyclists
Sportspeople from Derbyshire